Mubarik Gyenne-Adams (born December 18, 1991) known professionally as Emay, is a Canadian rapper and record producer from Hamilton, Ontario.

Early life 
Mubarik Gyenne-Adams (preferred name Mubarik Gyenne-Bayere) was born in Montreal, Quebec on December 18, 1991, the son of a couple who had immigrated to Canada from Ghana. He and his four sisters were raised in the tradition of Islam by his single mother. The family regularly moved between shelters throughout Ontario, living in Brampton briefly before settling in Hamilton.

Career 
Emay began his musical career in 2008 releasing mixtapes and collaborations before releasing his debut album entitled Adam in 2012. His first extended play, entitled Into It, was released later that year. In 2014 he released his second extended play, which was entitled Sinner, Song-writer. In 2017, Emay released his first music video for the track "Bakkah: The History of Humankind", before releasing his sophomore album entitled Ilah.

Discography

Studio albums 

 Adam (2012)
 Ilah (2017)

Mixtapes 

 A.D.D. (Altered Dynamic Dimensions) (2008)
 Emay, Karen O, and the Kids (2010)
Rock. Paper. Scissors. (2010) 
 Mind Altering Dynamics (2011)
 Mind Altering Dynamics (Instrumentals) (2011)
 Incorruptible (2011)

Extended plays 

Sounds Like (2010) 
Into It (2012)
 Sinner, Song-Writer (2014)

Singles 

 "Child (Refugee)" (2009)
 "Ze Drums" (2010) 
"Worried Shoes" (2010)
"Breaking" (2010) 
 "Wudhu "Cleanlinessness" (Demo)" (2014)
 "Blaow 'That Hurts'" (2016)
 "Bakkah: The History of Humankind" (2016)
 "Israfil 'Angels Trumpet'" (2016)
 "Yesu" (2017)
"Paystyle" (2018) 
"Republic of New Afrika" (2020)

Guest appearances 

 M+A – "Takes Me Back (M+A Remix)" from M+A Remixes.yes (2012)
 M+A – "When" from These Days (2013)
 M+A – "When" from When (2014)
 Mother Tareka – "Blow" from Imagine Something Different (2015)
 Klune – "Cinnamon" from Klune (2015)
 Quadrafonics – "Kissing the Gun" from Assemble (2016)

Compilation appearances 

 "Fresh Prince 2019 – Hjemmesnekk" from Fresh Prince 2019 – Hjemmesnekk (2019) 
 "Because Winter (feat. Lowell Boland)" from URBNET: Underground Hip-Hop Volume 7 (2011)

References

External links 
 Official Website at Bandcamp
 Emay discography at Discogs

Living people
Black Canadian musicians
21st-century Canadian rappers
21st-century Canadian male musicians
Alternative hip hop musicians
Indie rappers
Canadian male rappers
Downtempo musicians
Underground rappers
Musicians from Montreal
Canadian people of Ghanaian descent
1991 births